The Soviet Union (SU; ; СС) or Union of Soviet Socialists Republics (USSR) is a defunct 20th-century country based about Russia.

Soviet Union or Sovetsky Soyuz may also refer to:

 Sovetsky Soyuz (Soviet Union), the Soviet magazine Soviet Union
  (Soviet Union), the Soviet battleship class Soviet Union
 Soviet battleship Sovetsky Soyuz (Soviet Union), the battleship Soviet Union, lead ship of the eponymous class; see 
 SS Sovetskiy Soyuz (Soviet Union), the SS Soviet Union, the name of passenger-cargo ship  from 1949 to 1980
 A national sports team of the Soviet Union

See also
 Soviet of the Union, the lower parliamentary chamber of the Soviet Union
 Soviet (disambiguation)
 Union (disambiguation)
 CCCP (disambiguation)
 USSR (disambiguation)
 Russia (disambiguation)
 Sovetsky (disambiguation)
 Soyuz (disambiguation)

Disambiguation pages